Baker County School is a k-12 school in Newton, Georgia, United States.

Its sports teams are known as the Bears.

References

Public high schools in Georgia (U.S. state)
Education in Baker County, Georgia